Pterostylis vittata, commonly known as the banded greenhood or green-banded greenhood, is a plant in the orchid family Orchidaceae and is endemic to the south-west of Western Australia. The plants either have a rosette of leaves on a short stalk in the years when not flowering or stem leaves on a flowering spike. When flowering, it has up to about twenty five flowers which are translucent green with darker green stripes. It was formerly thought to occur in South Australia and Victoria but those collections are now thought to be of Pterostylis sanguinea.

Description
Pterostylis vittata, is a terrestrial,  perennial, deciduous, herb with an underground tuber. The dorsal sepal and petals form a hood or "galea" over the column. Flowering occurs from May to September.

Taxonomy and naming
Pterostylis vittata was first formally described in 1840 by John Lindley and the description was published in A Sketch of the Vegetation of the Swan River Colony. The specific epithet (vittata) is a Latin word meaning "striped" or "banded", referring to the striped galea.

Distribution and habitat
The banded greenhood occurs to the south of Perth and as far east as Balladonia, growing in forest, woodland and heath, although more often on granite outcrops in the east of its range. It was previously thought to occur in South Australia, Victoria and Tasmania, but those collections are now thought to be of P. sanguinea.

Conservation
Pterostylis vittata is classified as "not threatened" by the Government of Western Australia Department of Parks and Wildlife.

References

vittata
Endemic orchids of Australia
Orchids of Western Australia
Plants described in 1840